James Francis Checchio (born April 21, 1966 in Camden, New Jersey) is an American prelate of the Roman Catholic church.  Checchio served as rector of the Pontifical North American College in Rome from 2005 until 2016. On March 8, 2016, Pope Francis named Checchio as bishop of the Diocese of Metuchen in New Jersey to succeed Bishop Paul Bootkoski. Checchio was consecrated as bishop of Metuchen on May 3, 2016.

Biography

Early life 
James Checchio was born on April 21, 1966, in Camden, New Jersey.  He attended Paul VI High School in Haddon Township, New Jersey graduating in 1984. He then entered the University of Scranton in Scranton, Pennsylvania where he earned a bachelor's degree in 1988. Checchio subsequently entered the seminary and was sent to the Pontifical North American College in Rome to complete his formation for priestly ordination. He finished his university studies there with a Licentiate in Canon Law in 1993.

Priesthood 
Checchio was ordained a priest by Bishop James McHugh for the Diocese of Camden on June 20, 1992. After completing his studies in Rome, Checchio returned to the Diocese of Camden, where he served as secretary to Bishop McHugh,  Checchio also served as vice chancellor, director of communications, moderator of the curia,  episcopal vicar and as a member of the diocesan tribunal. He served as administrator of Holy Spirit Parish in Atlantic City, New Jersey, parochial vicar at St. Agnes Parish in Blackwood, New Jersey, and summer parochial vicar at St. Peter Parish in Merchantville, New Jersey and St. Peter Celestine Parish in Cherry Hill, New Jersey.

Checchio then attended the Pontifical University of St. Thomas Aquinas in Rome, where he earned a Doctor of Canon Law degree in 1998.  His dissertation was entitled An Examination of General Absolution Using the Criteria of a Juridic Act. In 2004, he also earned a Master of Business Administration degree from La Salle University in Philadelphia.

In 2000, Checchio was appointed a chaplain of his holiness by Pope John Paul II, which carries with it the title of monsignor. He was appointed to honorary prelate by Pope Benedict XVI in 2011.

Rector of the North American College 
Prior to his assignment as rector of the Pontifical North American College, Checchio served as vice rector there for three years. At the recommendation of the College's episcopal oversight Board, the Holy See appointed him rector on December 12, 2005, and his term began on January 16, 2006.  On November 23, 2015 it was announced that Checchio would be succeeded as rector by Father Peter C. Harman. Checchio's term as Rector ended February 1, 2016, at which time he returned to Camden.

Bishop of Metuchen 
On March 8, 2016, Checchio was appointed by Pope Francis to succeed to Bishop Paul Bootkoski as the fifth bishop of the Diocese of Metuchen. His episcopal consecration took place on May 3, 2016, at the Church of the Sacred Heart in South Plainfield, New Jersey. The principal consecrator was Archbishop John J. Myers; the co-consecrators were Bishop Bootkoski and Bishop Dennis J. Sullivan.

See also

 Catholic Church hierarchy
 Catholic Church in the United States
 Historical list of the Catholic bishops of the United States
 List of Catholic bishops of the United States
 Lists of patriarchs, archbishops, and bishops

References

External links
Roman Catholic Diocese of Metuchen Official Site

Episcopal succession

 

1966 births
Living people
People from Camden, New Jersey
Roman Catholic Diocese of Camden
Roman Catholic bishops in New Jersey
Pontifical North American College alumni
University of Scranton alumni
La Salle University alumni
Pontifical University of Saint Thomas Aquinas alumni
Pontifical North American College rectors
Bishops appointed by Pope Francis
21st-century Roman Catholic bishops in the United States